Moulsford railway station was on the original route of the Great Western Railway, being one of three intermediate stations provided when the line was extended from  to  in 1840.

History
The Great Western Railway was built and opened in stages. It had opened as far as Reading on 30 March 1840; on 1 June 1840 it was opened to Steventon, with three intermediate stations, the northernmost of which was Wallingford Road; it was possibly named Moulsford originally, being renamed by December 1840.

Wallingford Road station was located on the eastern side of the Reading–Wallingford main road (the present-day A329 road), about a mile to the north of Moulsford village, and slightly further from the village of Cholsey, which lies to the north. Being on the western side of the River Thames it was then in Berkshire; the boundaries were redrawn in 1974 placing the station site two miles inside present-day Oxfordshire.

Whilst the junction for the branch was at Moulsford station, the branch line track ran parallel to the main line for three-quarters of a mile before curving away. The Wallingford & Watlington Railway never reached the second-named town, and it was absorbed by the GWR in 1872.

In 1892, during quadrupling of the main line, the junction for Wallingford was resited down the line to the north-west, closer to the point of divergence, and a new station built there. Moulsford station closed on 29 February 1892, being replaced the same day by the new station which was known as Cholsey and Moulsford, being significantly closer to Cholsey than to Moulsford. Some of the original station buildings can still be seen at the site of Moulsford railway station.

To the south-east of the former station site is Moulsford Railway Bridge, a stone-faced brick bridge which crosses the River Thames, having four  skew arches.

Services

Notes

References

External links

Area around former Moulsford station on a navigable 1946 O.S. map

Disused railway stations in Oxfordshire
Former Great Western Railway stations
Great Western Main Line
Railway stations in Great Britain opened in 1840
Railway stations in Great Britain closed in 1892